Nikolay Botev (born 29 January 1963) is a Bulgarian bobsledder. He competed in the two man and the four man events at the 1988 Winter Olympics.

References

External links
 

1963 births
Living people
Bulgarian male bobsledders
Olympic bobsledders of Bulgaria
Bobsledders at the 1988 Winter Olympics
Sportspeople from Ruse, Bulgaria